The Black Lantern Corps is a fictional organization of corporeal revenants (resembling intelligent zombies or jiangshi) appearing in comic books published by DC Comics, related to the emotional spectrum. The group is composed of deceased fictional characters in zombie form that seek to eliminate all life from the DC Universe.

Publication history
Prior to the Blackest Night event, Black Hand ("leader" and the first member of the Black Lantern Corps) had already been established as a villain within the pages of Green Lantern. Writer Geoff Johns revisited his origin and expanded upon certain aspects of it during the Green Lantern: Secret Origin story arc (2008). During the arc, Hand's energy-absorbing weapon (previously thought to be an original invention) is revealed to have been constructed by Atrocitus, enemy of the Guardians of the Universe and future founder of the Red Lantern Corps. Atrocitus comes to Earth and approaches Hand, recognizing him as a "doorway to the black" that possesses the power to bring about the Blackest Night. Hand manages to escape and pockets the weapon as he flees. The possession of this weapon soon leads him to become an enemy of the Green Lantern Corps, as he now feels a need to extinguish the light of the emotional spectrum.

While being transported to prison, Black Hand experiences a sudden power surge that kills his captors. Xander roams the desert, hearing a voice instructing him to reclaim the souls of characters who were reanimated. Hand murders his family and commits suicide. The Guardian Scar arrives, and creates the first black power ring, which reanimates Black Hand. She reveals that Hand is the physical embodiment of death, and serves as the avatar of the Black Lantern Corps in the same manner that Ion, Parallax, and the Predator are for willpower, fear, and love respectively. Hand later digs up Bruce Wayne's corpse, removes his skull, and recites the Black Lantern oath for the first time. Soon after, black power rings descend upon the universe and begin reviving the deceased as Black Lanterns that attack both the heroes and the villains of the DC Universe. It is claimed the Power Battery is in Space Sector 666. Black Hand is seen holding Wayne's skull in all future appearances, embracing it in a necrophiliac manner in Blackest Night #1 as the black power rings appear from the Black Power Battery, exclaiming that Wayne's death "plays a far greater role in the Blackest Night" than anyone thinks. At the end of the issue, it is shown that Black Hand uses the skull to produce new power rings at will, creating two rings for the newly deceased Carter Hall and Kendra Saunders.

In Blackest Night #3, Indigo-1 describes the premise behind the Black Lantern Corps' fictional relationship with the universe. She explains that the darkness in existence before the creation of the universe is what powers the Black Lanterns. Banished at the dawn of time by the white light of creation, its fighting back causes the white light to be fractured into the emotional spectrum. The events transpiring throughout the titles of Blackest Night are a result of the darkness, once again, fighting back against creation. She goes on to describe how a combination of all seven lights can restore the white light of creation and bring an end to the Black Lanterns. Throughout the Blackest Night event, each time a Black Lantern successfully removes the heart of one of their victims, a black, lantern-shaped speech balloon (used within Green Lantern and Green Lantern Corps to indicate that a power ring is speaking) depicts an ever-rising power level increasing in increments of 0.1 percent. In Blackest Night #4, the power meter is filled and Scar is able to transport the Black Central Power Battery to Coast City, and the true mastermind behind the Black Lanterns is able to step into the main DC Universe: Nekron.

After being introduced into a primary role within the Blackest Night event, Indigo-1 recruits Hal Jordan to gather a team capable of recreating the white light of creation (chosen for having a personal connection to the most powerful members of the five remaining Corps). The story unfolding in Green Lantern depicts Jordan and Indigo-1 recruiting Carol Ferris, Sinestro, Atrocitus, Larfleeze, Saint Walker, to their purpose. In Blackest Night #5, the team assaults the Black Central Power Battery with the opposite results intended. Nekron is strengthened and able to recruit living characters reanimated from death to his Black Lantern Corps. Although the seven Corps representatives attempt to summon aid by recruiting temporary deputies until the rest of their Corps arrive - Ganthet joins the Green Lantern Corps, Barry Allen joins the Blue Lanterns, Lex Luthor is inducted into the Orange Lanterns, the Scarecrow joins the Sinestro Corps, the Atom joins the Indigo Tribe, Mera joins the Red Lanterns, and Wonder Woman is saved from her Black Lantern identity to join the Star Sapphires - they are nearly thwarted when Nekron digs up the Entity, the first life in the universe, and attempts to kill it. After Sinestro attempts and fails to merge with the entity similar to Hal's bond with Parallax - Sinestro powering the entity with his ego rather than his will to survive - Hal takes control of the Entity himself, noting that the heroes still chose to return to life even if Nekron gave them the opportunity. With this behind him, Hal merges with the entity and frees the reanimated heroes from Nekron's hold, creating the White Lantern Corps in the process, and subsequently reanimates Black Hand and the Anti-Monitor to deprive Nekron of his tether in the living world and his power source respectively. The White Lanterns used the power of the White Light to finally vanquish Nekron and the threat of the Blackest Night passed with the Black Lanterns disintegrating along with their power rings.

The rebirth of the Black Lantern Corps
Though seemingly destroyed, an aspect of the Black Lanterns returned within Firestorm when his dark undead persona emerged - claiming the name Deathstorm. Torturing the two hosts of the Firestorm Matrix, Deathstorm later traveled to the White Lantern Power Battery where he corrupted it. Whilst initially he intended to destroy it in order to kill all life in the universe, a voice came and commanded him not to do so. Instead, it ordered Deathstorm to bring it an army in order for it to command the power over life itself. With those words said, the White Lantern Power Battery in conjunction with Deathstorm created undead Black Lanterns of the 12 reanimated heroes and villains who had been reborn at the end of the Blackest Night. After Deathstorm steals the White Lantern, he, along with Firestorm, are transported to Qward in the Anti-Matter Universe by the Anti-Monitor, revealed to be behind the returns of the 12 Black Lanterns. However, they are all destroyed when Ronnie and Jason teamed up, thus allowing Ronnie's labor to be accomplished and for him to be returned to life by the White Entity.

The New 52
Following Black Hand's suicide to escape being inducted into the Indigo Tribe once again, a Black Power Ring emerges from his corpse, reviving him as a Black Lantern once again, although this did not restart the Blackest Night, possibly because Nekron was imprisoned in the Dead Zone at the time.
Black Hand returns to Earth and reanimates his family and various dead in the graveyard around his house, but Hal Jordan and Sinestro were able to defeat these "zombies" by detonating Sinestro's old yellow power battery. They are unaware that the Book of the Black has stated that Hal Jordan will be the greatest "Black Lantern" in the beyond.

When trapped in the Dead Zone (a realm between life and death) and deprived of his ring, Hal contemplates suicide as it was the only means to harnessing the power of the remaining Black Lantern ring and using it to escape the Dead Zone and stop the First Lantern.

After seeing the inhabitants of Korugar enter the Dead Zone, Hal finally makes the ultimate sacrifice and jumps off the Cliff. Hal claimed Black Hand's power ring and rises as a Black Lantern, which in turn reduced Black Hand's body to dust. With the help of the Indigo Tribe, Hal escapes from the Dead Zone and uses an army of Black Lanterns against Volthoom, but the undead legion is easily destroyed. Hal then proceeds to summon Nekron, who finally kills Volthoom. Hal then sends Nekron back to his tomb in the Dead Zone as his green ring returns to him, restoring him to life and membership in the Green Lantern Corps.

During the war between the New Gods and the various Lantern Corps, Black Hand reanimated the various Source Titans (including Relic) that were impeded within the Source Wall as Black Lanterns. However, after Highfather's misuse of the Life Equation, they are fully resurrected.

In the pages of Dark Nights: Death Metal, Batman was revealed to have been killed during the battle against Perpetua and the Dark Knights from the Dark Multiverse which would explain his Black Lantern Ring. He later uses the Black Lantern rings to revive Air Wave, Animal Man, Anthro, Atom, Bat Lash, Black Condor, Blue Beetle, Claw the Unconquered, Dan the Dyna-Mite, Dove I, Enemy Ace, Fate, Hawk II, Hourman, Human Bomb, Johnny Quick, Liberty Belle, Red Bee, both Red Tornadoes, Sandman, and TNT.

Prominent members
At San Diego Comic Con 2009, Geoff Johns was able to discuss his reasoning behind choosing Black Hand as the leader of the new Corps, the character properties of the Black Lanterns, and his own goals in writing their depictions. Commenting on the characters being chosen to reanimate during Blackest Night, Johns said:

During the creation of Blackest Night, Johns (not being interested in, or frightened by, zombies) wanted to bring back the deceased characters in a way that seemed horrifying and emotionally disturbing to the living characters they encountered. To accomplish that effect, the Black Lanterns have personalities and actively seek out those who will be most affected by their appearance. A prime example of Johns' use of personality distortion with the Black Lanterns is the Elongated Man (typically depicted as being a "light" character that uses his detective skill to "smell" when something is not right) looking upon his victims and remarking to his undead wife: "I smell a mystery." Johns identifies the power of the Black Lanterns as not necessarily being evil, but not being good either.

During his initial creation of the new Corps, Johns drew from information he had collected on light while taking physics classes. With the Corps of the emotional spectrum personifying life, he knew that this Corps would need to represent death. Black being an absence of light, he chose Black Hand as the leader of the Corps both for the character's name and also because of how much he enjoyed revamping villains while writing for Flash. Like the other members of the Black Lantern Corps, Johns wanted to take a different approach in his portrayal of Black Hand. Whereas other villains may have a particular motivation, Hand is meant to be depicted as a character who is clearly insane and whose presence makes others uncomfortable.

In Blackest Night #2, multiple black power rings attempt to reanimate the body of the Dove (Don Hall), only to be prevented from disturbing his grave by an invisible barrier. As they collide with the barrier, the rings' typical command ("Rise") is interrupted; the rings instead respond: "Don Hall of Earth at peace." This is the first depiction of the black power rings failing to recruit a member for the Black Lantern Corps. In an interview with IGN, Johns provides an explanation behind the Dove's immunity to the black power rings: "You'll learn more about this as we go forward. But really it speaks to the nature of Don Hall. He can't be desecrated by the likes of these things. He's untouchable in death and at total peace more than any other being in the universe." Reflecting on the limitations of the rings, Johns goes on to state that, even though magic is a "joke" to the black power rings (though the undead Giovanni "John" Zatara is capable of wielding black magic), Don is quite the opposite. Similarly, Blackest Night: Titans #1 shows Black Lantern Hank Hall unable to read Dawn Granger's emotions; her aura depicted as being white rather than a color from the emotional spectrum.

In Blackest Night: Batman #1, the spirit of Deadman is unable to prevent a black power ring from reviving his remains. Deadman attempts to possess his own corpse, but is unable to control it. During the Blackest Night panel at San Diego Comic Con 2009, Geoff Johns was asked whether the revived corpses of the Black Lanterns were speaking for themselves or if they were being controlled by an outside force. Johns declined to answer, implying that the question would be answered during the Blackest Night storyline. Similarly, while being overcome by a black power ring, the Spectre declares that he "will not be used." Prior to the Spectre's conversion, Black Hand makes note of the Shadowpact members Zatanna and Blue Devil being surrounded by an aura of life. Upon scanning the Phantom Stranger, Black Hand remarks that the Stranger is "neither living nor dead", and notes him as a person of interest to his Corps.

List of Black Lanterns

Current members
 Black Hand – Referred to as "the black incarnate", the avatar of the Black Lanterns.
 Batman – Killed in the invasion of the Dark Knights from the Dark Multiverse, Bruce Wayne was resurrected by a Black Lantern Ring and is secretly holding onto the last of the White Lantern energies which have been compressed into a bullet that potentially can be powerful enough to prevent him to turn into a more destructive and murderous form of Black Lantern.

Former members
Leadership
 Nekron – Leader of the Black Lantern Corps
 Scar – Guardian of the Corps and keeper of The Book of the Black

Blackest Night #1 (September 2009)
 Katma Tui
 the Martian Manhunter
 the Elongated Man
 Sue Dibny

Blackest Night #2 (October 2009)
 Aquaman – Named in issue #1, but not shown in costume
 Deadman – Also featured in Blackest Night: Batman, which shipped the same week
 the Hawk (Hank Hall)
 Aquagirl (Tula)
 the Dolphin
 Pariah
 Crispus Allen
 Tempest (Garth)
 Firestorm – Named in issue #1, shown in issue #2
 Hawkgirl (Kendra Saunders) – Killed in issue #1, shown in issue #2
 Hawkman (Carter Hall) – Killed in issue #1, shown in issue #2

Blackest Night: Batman #1 (October 2009)
 Abattoir
 the Blockbuster (Roland Desmond)
 Deacon Blackfire
 the KGBeast
 King Snake
 the Magpie
 the Trigger Twins – Tom and Tad Trigger
 the Ventriloquist (Arnold Wesker)
 John Grayson
 Mary Grayson
 Jack Drake
 Janet Drake

Green Lantern Corps (vol. 2) #39 (October 2009)
 Jack T. Chance – Shown, but not named, in Blackest Night #1
 Tomar-Re
 Jade – Named in Blackest Night #1, but not shown in costume.

Blackest Night: Superman #1 (October 2009)
 Superman (Earth-Two)
 Lois Lane (Earth-Two)
 Zor-El

Blackest Night: Titans #1 (October 2009)
 Terra (Tara Markov)
 Omen

Green Lantern (vol. 4) #45 (October 2009)
 Amon Sur
 Blume
 Xanshi; as a Mogo analogue
 Glomulus

Solomon Grundy #7 (November 2009)
 Solomon Grundy

Green Lantern Corps (vol. 2) #40 (November 2009)
 Bzzd – Shown, but not named, in Blackest Night #1

Blackest Night #3 (November 2009)
 Alexander Luthor, Jr.
 the Copperhead ("John Doe")
 Doctor Light (Arthur Light)
 Madame Rouge
 Maxwell Lord

Blackest Night: Superman #2 (November 2009)
 the Psycho-Pirate (Roger Hayden) – Shown, but not named, in Blackest Night #3

Green Lantern (vol. 4) #46 (November 2009)
 Khufu
 Chay-Ara
 Abin Sur – Named in Blackest Night #2, but not shown in costume
 Arin Sur

Blackest Night: Titans #2 (November 2009)
 Terry Long
 Robert Long
 the Hawk (Holly Granger)
 Pantha

Blackest Night: Batman #3 (December 2009)
 Tony Zucco
 Captain Boomerang (Digger Harkness) – Named in Blackest Night #1, but not shown in costume

Green Lantern Corps (vol. 2) #41 (December 2009)
 Ermey
 Ke'Haan – Shown, but not named, in Blackest Night #1
 Fentara Rrab
 Marata Rrab
 Santara Rrab

Blackest Night #4 (December 2009)
 Azrael (Jean Paul Valley Jr.)
 the Atom (Al Pratt) – Named in issue #1, shown in issue #4
 Jean Loring

Blackest Night: Titans #3 (December 2009)
 Baby Wildebeest – Shown, but not named, in issue #2

Green Lantern (vol. 4) #47 (December 2009)
 Laira – Named in issue #45, shown in issue #47
 Qull of the Five Inversions – Named in issue #45, shown in issue #47
 Roxeaume of the Five Inversions

Doom Patrol (vol. 5) #4 (January 2010)
 Celsius
 Tempest (Joshua Clay)
 the Negative Woman
 Cliff Steele's original body

Booster Gold (vol. 2) #26 (January 2010)
 the Blue Beetle (Ted Kord)

R.E.B.E.L.S. (vol. 2) #10 (January 2010)
 Stealth
 the Harbinger

Outsiders (vol. 4) #24 (January 2010)
 Katana's dead husband and children:
 Maseo Yamashiro
 Yuki Yamashiro
 Reiko Yamashiro

Blackest Night #5 (January 2010)
 Damage
 a clone of Bruce Wayne
 Animal Man
 Ice (Tora Olafsdotter)
 Wonder Woman
 Superman
 Superboy (Kon-El)
 Kid Flash (Bart Allen)
 the Green Arrow (Oliver Queen)
 Donna Troy

Justice League of America (vol. 2) #39 (January 2010)
 Vibe
 Zatara

Teen Titans (vol. 3) #77 (January 2010)
 the Ravager (Grant Wilson)
 the Ravager (Wade LaFarge)
 William Wintergreen
 Adeline Wilson

Blackest Night: The Flash #1 (February 2010)
 Professor Zoom the Reverse-Flash
 Solovar

Justice League of America (vol. 2) #40 (February 2010)
 Steel (Hank Heywood III) – Shown, but not named, in issue #39

Blackest Night: JSA #1 (February 2010)
 the Sandman (Wesley Dodds)
 Doctor Mid-Nite (Charles McNider)
 Mister Terrific (Terry Sloane)
 Johnny Quick

Green Lantern (vol. 4) #49 (February 2010)
 Driq

Suicide Squad #67 (March 2010)
 the Fiddler
 Psi
 Ravan
 the Atom (Adam Cray)

Weird Western Tales #71 (March 2010)
 Scalphunter
 Super-Chief
 Bat Lash
 Jonah Hex
 Quentin Turnbull

Catwoman (vol. 3) #83 (March 2010)
 Black Mask (Roman Sionis)

The Power of Shazam! #48 (March 2010)
 Osiris (Amon Tomaz)
 Sobek

Secret Six (vol. 3) #17 (March 2010)
 Yasemine Soze

Blackest Night: The Flash #2 (March 2010)
 the Mirror Master (Sam Scudder)
 the Golden Glider
 the Rainbow Raider
 the Top
 the Trickster (James Jesse)

Starman (vol. 2) #81 (March 2010)
 Starman (David Knight)

Green Lantern (vol. 4) #50 (March 2010)
 Aquababy
 the Bug-Eyed Bandit
 Green Lantern (Hal Jordan)

The Question #37 (March 2010)
 the Question (Charles Victor Szasz)

Blackest Night: The Flash #3 (April 2010)
 Captain Boomerang (Owen Mercer)

Blackest Night #7 (April 2010)
 Air Wave (Harold Jordan)

Green Lantern Corps (vol. 2) #46 (May 2010)
 Alexandra DeWitt
 the Anti-Monitor

Brightest Day #23 (April 2011)
 the Swamp Thing

Green Lantern (vol. 5) #20 (May 2013)
 Hal Jordan

Dark Nights: Death Metal #5 (November 2020)
 Air Wave (Larry Jordan)
 Animal Man
 Anthro
 Atom (Al Pratt)
 Bat Lash
 Black Condor (Ryan Kendall)
 Blue Beetle (Dan Garrett)
 Claw the Unconquered
 Dan the Dyna-Mite
 Dove (Don Hall)
 Enemy Ace
 Fate (Jared Stevens)
 Hawk (Holly Granger)
 Hourman (Rex Tyler)
 Human Bomb (Roy Lincoln)
 Johnny Quick (Johnny Chambers)
 Johnny Quick of Earth-3
 Liberty Belle
 Red Bee (Richard Raleigh)
 Red Tornado (Ma Hunkel)
 Red Tornado (android)
 Sandman (Wesley Dodds)
 TNT
 Ultraman

Dark Nights: Death Metal #6 (December 2020)
 Blue Beetle (Ted Kord)
 The Batman Who Laughs' original body

Though an exact list of the former Green Lanterns reanimated by black power rings does not exist, Kyle Rayner's ring states that all of the deceased Green Lanterns within the Oan crypt in Green Lantern Corps (vol. 2) #39 were transformed into Black Lanterns.

Oath
As with the other Lantern Corps, Black Hand devised an oath for the Black Lanterns:

Entity

While the Black Lantern Corps are powered by the black emptiness of space which represents death and therefore does not belong to the Emotional Spectrum, Black Hand is revealed to be the physical embodiment for these corps, in the same manner that Ion is the embodiment of willpower for the Green Lantern Corps. During the climax of Blackest Night #8, Boston Brand tells the Corps' leaders that Black Hand is the "tether keeping Nekron within our world", and that as the avatar of Death he is also the only key to defeating the Black Lanterns permanently. Using the White Lantern power of Life, Hal Jordan commands "William Hand of Earth - Live", resurrecting Black Hand and removing him as the Black Lantern Corps' primary power source - which deals a crippling and eventually fatal blow to the Black Lanterns.

The Book of the Black
Hidden within the vaults of Oa is a massive black tome known as The Ultimate Facilitator of the Blackest Night. Written in corrupted blood by the traitorous Guardian of the Universe, Scar, the book contains prophecies. The prophecies indicate which Earth heroes have the abilities to weather the Blackest Night and ensure the survival or destruction of the universe.

Also within its pages is all the forbidden history of the Guardians of the Universe, and in an effort to protect its secrets, the rogue Guardian was forced to imprison the Sinestro Corps talekeeper Lyssa Drak inside the book. After Scar's true death and the end of the Blackest Night, The Book of the Black is found by Ganthet, who notes it retains much forbidden knowledge within its pages. He decides to keep it a secret from the other Guardians and entrusts Guy Gardner with the secret.

The book is later taken by Krona who, after releasing Lyssa Drak from inside the book, takes it to the Dead Planet of Ryut. There, after detecting the "New Guardians", it opens its pages to unveil the history of Krona. They are soon afterwards attacked by the book's keeper, the former Sinestro Corps member Lyssa Drak. She is capable of trapping Sinestro himself, Carol Ferris, Indigo-1, Atrocitus, Saint Walker and Larfleeze inside the book. However, Sinestro is able to prevent her from capturing Hal Jordan as well, by causing a detonation using the combined energy of their rings. The energy explosion also affects The Book of the Black, which disappears in a rainbow light, leaving only behind the rings of the six trapped Lanterns.

The book is later seen on Oa while it forces the captured Lanterns to relive their lives prior to acquiring their current rings. After the defeat of Krona and the release of the New Guardians, the Book is taken by Lyssa Drak. She is later confronted by the now Green Lantern Sinestro who tracked her with the aid of an energy-manipulating alien hero he fought while in the Sinestro Corps. Contact with the Book of the Black reveals the Guardians' plan to replace the Corps with the 'Third Army'.

Subsequently, the book returns to Black Hand's possession as it is sought by the Guardians of the Universe. The book reveals to Black Hand that Hal Jordan is not his enemy. When questioned about that, it reveals that Jordan will be the greatest Black Lantern. After Black Hand is imprisoned in the Chamber of Shadows, the Book of Black is retrieved by Green Lantern B'dg. However, the book sucks B'dg and Simon Baz into it and returns to Black Hand.

The book's prophecy is revealed to be true when Hal Jordan transforms into a Black Lantern as a means to escape the Dead Zone. Hal then summons Nekron in order to defeat the First Lantern, Volthoom. After his defeat, Hal is released from being a Black Lantern and returns to life as Green Lantern once again.

Powers and abilities

The Black Lanterns are corpses reanimated by black power rings, which are fueled by the power of death. Corpses reanimated by black power rings are reconstructed if damaged, keeping the body in working order at all times. Black power rings are capable of regenerating typically fatal injuries inflicted upon their users (including the complete dissolution). The rings generate black tendrils to "root" themselves into the corpses, making it impossible to remove them by physical force.

The first black power rings possess no charge, but each time a Black Lantern kills someone and removes their heart, .01 percent power is restored to every ring in the Corps. In Blackest Night #3, Indigo-1 solidifies this theme by explaining that those who rise feed off emotion. Even at low power levels, black rings enable their user to fly and create black energy constructs. They are also unaffected by magic. In "classic" zombie fashion, the bite of a Black Lantern induces a slow-acting necrosis that eventually turns the victim into a fellow Black Lantern. It is unknown if this power can work on any living being, or only those characters who have been reanimated from death before (such as Superman, the Green Arrow, and Donna Troy).

Nekron uses the Anti-Monitor as a physical power source within the Black Power Battery. It is alluded to in several comics and "Origins and Omens" backstories that it is the Anti-Monitor's desire for the end of humanity that made him the primary candidate to become the Battery's power supply following his betrayal and subsequent murder at the hands of Superboy-Prime during the Sinestro Corps War. In a climactic battle with all the collective Lantern Corps, the Anti-Monitor is nearly freed from the Power Battery and revealed to have only succumbed partially to Nekron's influence (manifested by the visual Black Hand symbol seen on every Black Lantern only being half completed), demanding that he be freed so that he could exact revenge on Nekron for his imprisonment. As part of the final 'coup de grace' against the Black Lantern Corps, the Entity also commands "Anti-Monitor of Qward - Live", which frees him from the Black Power Battery - destroying it in the process. It was the Anti-Monitor's physical corpse, coupled with Black Hand's presence as the entity of Death, that served as the full source of the Black Lantern Corps' power.

Black Lanterns are able to read the emotions as colored auras that correlate to the Emotional Spectrum. Multiple emotions read as a multi-colored aura, while unreadable emotions come out as white. Furthermore, demonic and underworld dwellers (such as Etrigan the Demon) are read with a black aura, apparently as unreadable as the white one due to their dead nature. A state of profound suspended animation is enough to fool a Black Lantern by making the target of suspended animation invisible to the senses of the Black Lantern. Emotionless hearts such as the Scarecrow's render their bearers equally invisible to the Black Lanterns. When facing beings with warped mental states, or otherwise addled minds (such as Bizarro), the correlation between the emotion detected and the actual color that the Black Lanterns see is inverted. In addition to the abilities granted to them by the rings, Black Lanterns retain any skills and superpowers they may have had in life.

Vulnerabilities
Black Lanterns are vulnerable to white light and a combination of green light with another Corps' light.

Once a black power ring is destroyed, the corpse it animates becomes inert.

Kimiyo Hoshi and Halo can completely destroy Black Lanterns by using their light-based powers. Conner Kent used the Medusa Mask to destroy two Black Lanterns by forcing them to experience the full force of the Emotional Spectrum, irritating their black power rings enough that they remove themselves from their bearers and flee. The Black Lanterns are also vulnerable to Wonder Woman's Lasso of Truth. The "touch" of a Black Lantern, typically used to remove their victims' hearts and drain them of emotional energy, can also sever the connection between other Black Lanterns and their black power ring. Barry Allen was able to deactivate the black rings that were 'targeting' him and Hal Jordan by using time travel, jumping two seconds into the future so that the rings would shut down when they could not sense their 'assigned' wearers.

One common way of stopping a Black Lantern is to injure them faster than their ring is able to regenerate their body (such as the plasma that a Red Lantern vomits out, a mutated pitcher plant with strong digestive liquids, or the intense heat at Mogo's core).

Others that have proven resistant to the Black Lantern rings are either those who have wielded a power ring before or generally otherworldly beings such as Etrigan the Demon, who lacks a human heart and human emotions, Atrocitus, whose heart was replaced by his ring, the Shade, who is truly immortal and thus cannot die, and Osiris, whose magical nature allowed him some semblance of control over the ring. Don Hall (the original Dove) was immune to recruitment into the Black Lantern Corps as he was "at peace", which destroyed the Black Lantern Rings that attempted to recruit him.

Another vulnerability of their rings' power is that the odd physics behind magical power can dumbfound their abilities, as was the case when Arthur's daughter Serenity cast protection spells which disrupted the blackout effect of his power ring.

Other versions
In the Flashpoint universe, the successful murder of William Hand at the hands of the Red Lantern called Atrocitus freed Nekron from imprisonment long before several of the different colored Lantern Corps and the long-prophesied "War of Light" ever erupted across the Universe. Shortly after being released, Nekron used his dark powers to create the Black Lantern Corps using the corpses of the Green Lanterns and countless other lifeforms that have fallen before him.

Like in the original DCU, Nekron is leading his Black Lanterns on a quest to eradicate all life in the universe. As of now, over 200 of the Sectors under the jurisdiction of the Guardians of the Universe, save for those that have already been rend asunder by a roving army of soulless, renegade Manhunter drones, have been systematically wiped out by Nekron and his forces. Of the 2,793 remaining sectors left, at least half of them have come under attack from the Black Lantern Corps.

The New 52: Futures End
In the possible future of Futures End set five years later:

 Krona is reanimated as a Black Lantern and leads his Black Lanterns against Hal Jordan and Relic.
 Sinestro smashes Lyssa Drak's skull on the ground, which summons a Black Lantern Power Ring, and Sinestro uses it to reanimate his Corps as Black Lanterns.

In other media
In Green Lantern: The Animated Series, the clothing portions of Aya's body change to black after Aya takes over the Anti-Monitor's body. Her agenda, while initially is eliminating all emotion from the universe, eventually changes to destroying organic life (by manipulating the Big Bang) and filling the universe with self-replicating machines instead. This is likely an allusion to the Black Lantern Corps, although at no point does her emblem changes from the regular Green Lantern shape. Also, when the heroes investigate Scar's chambers for clues, a Black Book with the Corps' symbol is visible on a shelf.
In Injustice: Gods Among Us, there are Blackest Night-inspired Black Lantern skins for Batman, Hawkgirl, Superman, The Flash, and Doomsday.
There is a Black Lantern color shader for Green Lantern in the sequel game, Injustice 2, called "Death."

See also
 Blackest Night
 Black Hand
 Scar

References

Comics characters introduced in 2009
DC Comics aliens
DC Comics demons
DC Comics supervillain teams
DC Comics undead characters
Green Lantern characters
Fictional zombies and revenants
Fictional cannibals
Fictional mass murderers
Characters created by Geoff Johns
Characters created by Ethan Van Sciver
Fictional characters with death or rebirth abilities
Undead supervillains
Zombies in comics